Sahel Sporting Club is  a Nigerien football club based in Niamey. The club was formed in 1974 from  the football club Secteur 7.

Achievements
Niger Premier League: 13
1973 (as Secteur 7)
1974, 1986, 1987, 1990, 1991, 1992, 1994, 1996, 2003, 2004, 2007, 2009

Niger Cup: 13
1974, 1978, 1986, 1987, 1992, 1993, 1996, 2004, 2006, 2011, 2012, 2014, 2017
Runner-up: 1991, 1999

Performance in CAF competitions
CAF Champions League: 3 appearances
2004 – Second Round
2008 – Preliminary Round
2010 – Preliminary Round

 African Cup of Champions Clubs: 3 appearances
1991 – First Round
1992 – First Round
1993 – First Round

CAF Confederation Cup: 4 appearances
2006 – Preliminary Round
2007 – Preliminary Round
2011 – First Round
2012 – Preliminary Round

CAF Cup Winners' Cup: 3 appearances
1975 – First Round
1994 – First Round
1997 – Preliminary Round

Current squad

References
 

Association football clubs established in 1974
Football clubs in Niger
Super Ligue (Niger) clubs
Sport in Niamey
1974 establishments in Niger